"Shotgun Girl" is a song recorded by American country music duo the JaneDear girls. It was released on March 21, 2011, as the second single from the album the JaneDear girls. The song reached number 36 on the Billboard Hot Country Songs chart.  The song was written by Danelle Leverett and Deric Ruttan.

Chart performance

References

2011 singles
2011 songs
the JaneDear girls songs
Songs written by Deric Ruttan
Song recordings produced by John Rich
Reprise Records singles